The Hopkinsville Hoppers were a baseball team based in Hopkinsville, Kentucky between 1904 and 1954. The team initially played as the "Browns" in 1904, before adopting the "Hoppers" moniker.

Hopkinsville teams played as exclusively as members of the Kentucky–Illinois–Tennessee League in 1904–1905, 1910–1914, 1916, 1922–1923, 1935–1942, 1946–1954.

Hopkinsville was affiliate of the Milwaukee Brewers (AA) from 1937 to 1939; Chicago Cubs 1946; Philadelphia A's 1953–1954.

Today, the "Hoppers" team moniker has been adopted by the summer collegiate baseball wood-bat team that plays as a member of the Ohio Valley League, after the current team was founded in 2012. In 2012, Hopkinsville had the highest attendance in the league.

Notable alumni

 Al Demaree (1910)
 Dave Koslo (1939) 1949 NL ERA Title
 Dusty Rhodes (1947)
 Johnny Schmitz (1938) 2 x MLB All-Star
 Art Wilson (1922)

Year-by-year record

References

Chicago Cubs minor league affiliates
Defunct baseball teams in Kentucky
Professional baseball teams in Kentucky
Defunct minor league baseball teams
Kentucky-Illinois-Tennessee League teams
Philadelphia Athletics minor league affiliates
1954 disestablishments in Kentucky
Hopkinsville
Baseball teams disestablished in 1954
Baseball teams established in 1905